Theodore Hyrtakenos, Latinized as Theodorus Hyrtacenus, was a court official of the Byzantine Empire. He flourished in the time of the Andronikos II Palaiologos (r. 1282–1328), where he was the superintendent of the public teachers of rhetoric and belles lettres. 

Ninety-three of his letters, a congratulatory address, and three of his funeral orations are extant. Their stilted rhetoric hinders their address, but they speak towards an extensive acquaintance with ancient poetry. Also extant are a panegyric on the Virgin Mary, a panegyric on Aninas Thaumaturgus, and a description of the garden of Saint Anna in Nazareth.

References

Further reading
 A. Karpozilos, "The Correspondence of Theodoros Hyrtakenos", Jahrbuch der Österrichischen  Byzantinistik, 43 (1993), pp. 221-31

13th-century Byzantine people
14th-century Byzantine people
Byzantine officials
14th-century Byzantine writers
Byzantine letter writers